Nuculana minuta, or the Minute nut clam, is a marine bivalve mollusc in the family Nuculanidae. It can be found along the Atlantic coast of North America, ranging from Labrador to Maine.

References

Nuculanidae
Molluscs described in 1776
Taxa named by Johan Christian Fabricius